Roadhouse was a short-lived British rock band that once included former Def Leppard members Pete Willis and Frank Noon. According to the band's website, the band recorded a four song demo with Noon as their drummer. However, Noon was no longer in Roadhouse by the time of the recording of their debut album. Roadhouse released their self-titled album in August 1991. The album is often referred to as On a Desert Road, a reference to a line in the song "Time". Several singles were released from the album, with B-sides that are not on the album. The band toured in support of Ian Gillan/No Sweat/Saxon/Two Tribes and recorded four videos for MTV. The single "Hell Can Wait" reached number 9 in the UK Rock Chart, and the single "Tower of Love" was used in the film Harley Davidson and the Marlboro Man.

Band members
Paul Jackson - lead vocals, acoustic guitar, harmonica
Pete Willis - guitars, backing vocals
Richard Day - guitars, backing vocals
Wayne Grant - bass, backing vocals
Frank Noon - drums (1990)
Trevor Brewis - drums (1990-1991)
Brian Hall - guitars, backing vocals (1991) (live substitute)

References

External links
 Official website

English rock music groups